Vassos Karageorghis (Greek: Βάσος Καραγιώργης) FBA (29 April 1929 – 21 December 2021) was a Cypriot archaeologist and director of the Department of Antiquities, Cyprus.

Biography
He attended the Pancyprian Gymnasium, he studied Classics in the University of Athens and at University College London, having the chance to excavate at Verulamium under Sir Mortimer Wheeler. He was Assistant Curator of the Cyprus Museum between 1952 and 1960 and Curator from 1960 until 1963. Afterwards with the retirement of Porphyrios Dikaios he became Director of the Department of Antiquities from 1963 to 1989. He is notable for the excavation of the Iron Age necropolis of Salamis, his excavations at Kition and Geometric necropolis at Palaepaphos. He published extensive catalogues of Cypriot collections in museums in Cyprus and abroad. In 1981, Karageorghis became a founding member of the World Cultural Council. He was Professor of archaeology and Director of the Archaeological Research Unit of the University of Cyprus.

He died on 21 December 2021 at the age of 92.

Publications
 A Cypriot Silver Bowl Reconsidered, 1. The Iconography of the Decoration Metropolitan Museum Journal, v. 34 (1999)
 Ancient Art from Cyprus: The Cesnola Collection in The Metropolitan Museum of Art (2000)
 The Cesnola Collection of Cypriot Art: Terracottas (2016)

References

1929 births
2021 deaths
Cypriot archaeologists
Corresponding Fellows of the British Academy
Founding members of the World Cultural Council
Alumni of the University of London
People from Famagusta District
20th-century archaeologists
21st-century archaeologists
National and Kapodistrian University of Athens alumni
Academic staff of the University of Cyprus